Mark Killilea may refer to:
 Mark Killilea Snr (1896–1970), Irish Fianna Fáil Party politician, TD and Senator
 His son Mark Killilea Jnr (born 1939), also an Irish Fianna Fáil Party politician, TD and Senator and MEP